The Great Ruaha River is a river in south-central Tanzania that flows through the Usangu wetlands and the Ruaha National Park east into the Rufiji River. It traverses and marks the borders between Iringa Region, Dodoma Region and Morogoro Region. The population of the basin is mainly sustained by irrigation and water-related livelihoods such as fishing and livestock keeping.

Size 

The Great Ruaha River supplies 22 percent of the total flow of the Rufiji catchment system. Thirty-eight species of fish have been identified in the Great Ruaha River.

The river's headwaters are in the Kipengere Range In west Njombe Region.  From there the Great Ruaha River descends to the Usangu plains, an important region for irrigated agriculture and livestock in Tanzania. The river eventually reaches the Mtera Dam and then flows south to the Kidatu Dam. These two generate about 50 percent of Tanzania's electricity. The river continues southwards and flows across the Selous Game Reserve before reaching the Rufiji River. The major rivers contributing to the Great Ruaha River are Lukosi, Yovi, Kitete, Sanje, Little Ruaha, Kisigo, Mbarali, Kimani, and Chimala whereas the small ones include Umrobo, Mkoji, Lunwa, Mlomboji, Ipatagwa, Mambi, and Mswiswi rivers.

Issues 

Decreased flows in the Great Ruaha have been recorded since the early 1990s, resulting in complete drying of sections of the river in 1993 and in dry years since (illustration above). This has been attributed to uncontrolled and poor water management, with the large rice irrigation schemes playing a major role.

By 2019, the Great Ruaha experienced no water flow for several months per year. A report published by the World Bank listed the Great Ruaha as an endowment in crisis due to environmental factors.

References

Sources 
 WWF.org - The Ruaha Water Programme
 Ruaha information with images
 FAO review
 FAO - fact sheet on the ecohydrology of the Great Ruaha River (2003)
 Öhman, May-Britt, Taming Exotic Beauties: Swedish Hydro Power Constructions in Tanzania in the Era of Development Assistance, 1960s - 1990s, Stockholm, 2007, PhD Thesis, http://www.diva-portal.org/smash/record.jsf?pid=diva2:12267

 
Rivers of Tanzania
Rufiji River